A Bien de Interés Cultural is a category of the heritage register in Spain. The term is also used in Venezuela and other Spanish-speaking countries.

The term literally means a "good of cultural interest" ("goods" in the economic sense) and includes not only material heritage (cultural property), like monuments or movable works of art, but also intangible cultural heritage, such as the Silbo Gomero language.

Some bienes enjoy international protection as World Heritage Sites or Masterpieces of the Oral and Intangible Heritage of Humanity.

History 
In Spain, the category of Bien de Interés Cultural dates from 1985 when it replaced the former heritage category of Monumento nacional (national monument) in order to extend protection to a wider range of cultural property. The category has been translated as "Cultural Interest Asset". Monumentos are now identified as one of the sub-categories of Bien de Interés Cultural.

Sub-categories 

The movable heritage designated as Bienes de Interés Cultural ("Cultural Interest Assets") includes archeological artefacts, archives and large works of art.  Such protected objects may well be kept in a building which is itself a BIC.

Non-movable heritage is divided into the following classifications:
Monumento (monument)
Conjunto histórico (historical ensemble, group or set)
Jardín histórico (historical garden, e.g. the Real Jardín Botánico de Madrid)
Sitio histórico (literally a historic site, the term is used for cultural landscapes, e.g. Riotinto mines)
Zona arqueológica (archaeological area or zone, e.g. Archaeological site of Atapuerca)

Regional variants

Under the Spanish system, regions maintain their own registers of cultural heritage (see Patrimonio histórico español).  There have been some differences in approach between autonomous communities.
An example is bullfighting (which at a national level is now regulated by the Ministry of Culture). Madrid's regional government considers that bullfighting events should be protected as cultural heritage, whereas in Catalonia a ban on bullfighting came into effect in 2012, although this was later overturned by the Supreme Court.

See also
 Lists of Bienes de Interés Cultural
 Patrimonio histórico español

References

External links 
 Declaran Bien de Interés Cultural de la República Bolivariana de Venezuela la canción Alma Llanera
  The Protection of Historic Properties: A Comparative Study of Administrative ...By Consuelo Olimpia Sanz Salla
 Procedimiento y proceso administrativo práctico, Volume 2
 XX Jornadas del Patrimmonio Cultural de la Región de MurciaBy Pedro Collado y José Antonio Melgares (coord.)
 Boletin de la Real Academia de la Historia. TOMO CCII. NUMERO III. AÑO 2005By Vv.aa
 Cuerpo Tecnico de la Comunidad Autonoma de Extremadura. Especialidad ..
  Código de la Administración Gallega By Jaime Rodriguez-Arana Muñoz, Miguel Ángel Sendín García
 Manual de arte rupestre de CundinamarcaBy Alvaro Botiva Contreras
 XXII Jornadas de Patrimonio Cultural de la Región de MurciaBy Varios Autores
 Los tesoros del mar y su régimen jurídicoBy Jesús Ignacio Fernández Domingo
 Código legislativo de CantabriaBy Cantabria

Spanish culture
Venezuelan culture
Law of Spain